The Leichhardt Highway is a major transport route in Queensland, Australia. It is a continuation northward from Goondiwindi of the Newell Highway, via a  section of the Cunningham Highway.

It runs northward from Goondiwindi for more than 600 kilometres until its termination at the Capricorn Highway near the small town of Westwood.

The highway is a state-controlled strategic road, except for the section concurrent with the Gore Highway, which is a state-controlled part of the National Network.

History
It is named after Prussian explorer Ludwig Leichhardt who travelled a route in the 19th Century that roughly parallels today's highway.

Upgrade
A project to replace the Banana Creek bridge, at a cost of $7.7 million, was completed in April 2022.

List of towns along the Leichhardt Highway
Travelling from south to north:
 Goondiwindi
 Moonie
 Condamine
 Miles
 Guluguba
 Wandoan
 Taroom
 Theodore
 Banana
 Dululu
 Westwood

Major intersections

Gallery

See also

 Highways in Australia
 List of highways in Queensland
 List of highways numbered 85

References

Highways in Queensland
Darling Downs
Central Queensland